The Ministry of Education, Science, Technology and Vocational Training is a ministry of the Tanzanian government responsible for the provision of education, vocational training and policy on science and technology.

History 
The Ministry was formed by President John Magufuli and was created as an amalgamation of responsibilities from the Ministry of Education and Vocational Training and the Ministry of Communication, Science and Technology. The communications role was merged into the Ministry of Works, Transport and Communications.

See also
 Education in Tanzania
 Government of Tanzania
 University of Dar es Salaam

References

External links
 

Education
Tanzania
Education in Tanzania
Tanzania, Education
2015 establishments in Tanzania